Cayo Sabinal is a cay on the northern coast of Cuba, in the municipality of Nuevitas, Camagüey Province. Has an area of 335 km².

Geography
It is the southernmost island of the Jardines del Rey archipelago, and is located north of the Bay of Nuevitas (Bahia de Nuevitas), east of Cayo Guajaba and the Bay of la Gloria (Bahia de la Gloria) and borders the Atlantic Ocean to the north. It is connected to mainland Cuba west of Nuevitas.

The island is a popular tourist destination, attractions on the cay include Punta Piedra and Playa los Pinos.

References

External links
Cayo Sabinal website

Nuevitas
Sabinal
Populated places in Camagüey Province
Geography of Camagüey Province